Axel Jang (born 28 December 1968 in WerdauSaxony) is an East German-German bobsledder who competed in the early 1990s. He won three medals at the FIBT World Championships with two silvers (Two-man and four-man: both 1990 for East Germany) and one bronze (Four-man: 1991 for Germany).

Jang also finished sixth in the four-man event at the 1992 Winter Olympics in Albertville.

References
Bobsleigh two-man world championship medalists since 1931
Bobsleigh four-man world championship medalists since 1930
Four-man bobsleigh Winter Olympic results: 1988-2002

1968 births
Bobsledders at the 1992 Winter Olympics
German male bobsledders
Living people
Olympic bobsledders of Germany
Sportspeople from Saxony